Manchester City Women's Football Club is an English football club based in Manchester. The club was founded in 1988 and has competed in the UEFA Women's Champions League every season since 2016–17.

History
The club's first entry into European competition came in 2016, when – as runners-up in the 2015 FA WSL – they were given direct entry to the knockout stages of the 2016–17 UEFA Women's Champions League. Given several easier draws, City managed to progress to the semi-finals, where they met the holders Lyon. Despite a creditable win in the away leg thanks to a goal from FIFA World Player of the Year Carli Lloyd they were beaten over two legs and went out at that stage. History would repeat itself the following season, when Lyon again knocked City out at the semi-final stage once again, though with only a single goal across both legs dividing the two teams. In both cases, Lyon went on to win the competition.

Their third season in Europe – 2018–19 – saw City instantly facing tough opposition in Atlético Madrid, who had won their national league the previous two seasons. City were unable to overcome the challenge, drawing away before losing at home to exit the competition in the Round of 32.

UEFA competitions

Overall record

By country

See also
English women's football clubs in international competitions

References

Europe
Manchester City